Secret Service may refer to:
 Secret service, various kinds of police or intelligence organizations
 United States Secret Service, a federal law enforcement agency tasked with investigative and protective responsibilities
 Confederate Secret Service, a number of secret service operations by the Confederate States of America (1861–1865)
 South African Secret Service, an intelligence agency

Radio, film, and television 
 Secret Service (TV series), a 1990s American television series
 The Secret Service, a 1969 British children's television series
 Secret Service (1919 film), an American lost silent film
 Secret Service (1931 film), an American Civil War spy film starring Richard Dix
 Kingsman: The Secret Service, a 2014 spy action-comedy film starring Taron Egerton

Video and arcade games 
 Secret Service (2001 video game)
 Secret Service (2008 video game)
 Secret Service 2, a 2003 video game
 Secret Service (pinball), a 1988 pinball machine by manufacturer Data East

Music 
 Secret Service (band), a Swedish pop group of the 1980s
 "The Secret Service", a song by Irving Berlin
 Kingsman: The Secret Service (soundtrack), the soundtrack to the 2014 film

Print 
 The Secret Service (comics), later Kingsman: The Secret Service, a 2012–2013 comic book miniseries by Mark Millar and Dave Gibbons, basis for the 2014 film
 Secret Service (magazine), a 1993–2001 Polish gaming monthly

See also
 Australian Secret Intelligence Service
 Canadian Security Intelligence Service
 Secret Intelligence Service, a British intelligence agency better known as MI6
 List of secret services
 List of intelligence agencies